Competitor for  Canada
 

Black Hawk (born 23 May 1877, date of death unknown) was a First Nations lacrosse player who competed in the 1904 Summer Olympics for Canada. In 1904 he was member of the Mohawk Indians Lacrosse Team and won the bronze medal in the lacrosse tournament.

References

External links
 Profile at Sports Reference.com
 

1877 births
Year of death missing
Canadian lacrosse players
Lacrosse players at the 1904 Summer Olympics
Olympic lacrosse players of Canada
First Nations sportspeople
Canadian Mohawk people
Olympic bronze medalists for Canada